Lt. Roger "Bill" Terry (August 13, 1921 – June 11, 2009) from Los Angeles, California was one of the Tuskegee Airmen.  He served in the U.S. Army Air Corps in World War II. He was dishonorably discharged after the Freeman Field Mutiny.

Early life
Terry was from Los Angeles, California. Terry graduated from the University of California, Los Angeles where his roommate was the baseball player Jackie Robinson. Both Terry and Jackie Robinson would go on to be court-martialed for resisting segregation in the U.S. Armed forces.

Career

Terry joined the Tuskegee Airmen after graduating from UCLA in 1941. In February 1945 he graduated flight school and had the rank of 2nd Lieutenant. The Whites only officer's club was much better than the one afforded to the black officers. Terry and over 100 black officers were determined to integrate the white officer's club. A man who would go on to become Detroit's first black mayor Lt. Coleman Young was also one of protestors.

Freeman Field Mutiny
At Freeman Field in 1945, a large number of the Tuskegee Airmen attempted to integrate the all white officer's club. The black pilots were arrested and charged with insubordination. Terry was arrested for "jostling" one officer in the incident which later became known as the Freeman Field Mutiny.

Terry was charged with insubordination and also charged with getting physical with a white officer. The insubordination charge was not upheld, but he was convicted of getting physical with a white officer. His punishment was a $150 dollar fine, a reduction in rank, and he was dishonorably discharged.

In 1995 the assistant secretary of the Air Force, Rodney Coleman removed disciplinary letters from the files of the Tuskegee airmen. He also removed Terry's court martial and dishonorable discharge and restored his rights and privileges.

Terry was said to have been proud of his behavior in the mutiny and subsequent court-martial.

After service
Terry earned a law degree and worked for the District Attorney of Los Angeles, California. He was active in Tuskegee Airmen causes and even became an advisor on the film Red Tails. In Los Angeles, there is a square which has been dedicated to Terry.

Awards
Congressional Gold Medal awarded to the Tuskegee Airmen in 2006

Death
Terry died of heart failure on June 11, 2009. He was 87. He is buried at Inglewood Park Cemetery in Inglewood, California.

See also
 Dogfights (TV series)
 Executive Order 9981
 Freeman Field Mutiny
 List of Tuskegee Airmen
 Military history of African Americans
 The Tuskegee Airmen (movie)
 Tuskegee Airmen

References

External links
 Fly (2009 play about the 332d Fighter Group)
Roger Bill Terry article
 Tuskegee Airmen at Tuskegee University
 Tuskegee Airmen Archives at the University of California, Riverside Libraries.
 Tuskegee Airmen, Inc.
 Tuskegee Airmen National Historic Site (U.S. National Park Service) 
 Tuskegee Airmen National Museum

1921 births
2009 deaths
Congressional Gold Medal recipients
Military personnel from Tuskegee, Alabama
Tuskegee Airmen
United States Army Air Forces officers
African-American aviators
21st-century African-American people